Setch may refer to:

 Setch or Setchey, a village now part of West Winch in King's Lynn and West Norfolk
Setch., taxonomic author abbreviation for William Albert Setchell (1864–1943), American botanist
Terry Setch (born 1936), British painter

See also 
Setsch, the German name of Seč, Kočevje, an abandoned settlement in Slovenia
 Sech (disambiguation)